The 1990 Utah State Aggies football team represented Utah State University during the 1990 NCAA Division I-A football season as a member of the Big West Conference. The Aggies were led by fifth-year head coach Chuck Shelton and played their home games at Romney Stadium in Logan, Utah. They finished the season with a record of five wins, five losses, and one tie (5–5–1, 5–1–1 Big West). 

Utah State finished Big West play tied for second in the conference standings with Fresno State, losing only to eventual conference champion San Jose State. The 1990 season would mark the high point of the Chuck Shelton era at Utah State, as the Aggies finished with a .500 winning percentage (the first time the Aggies had a non-losing record since the 1981 season).

Schedule

References

Utah State
Utah State Aggies football seasons
Utah State Aggies football